David Robert Mullen is an American artist and photographer. His art spans a wide range of styles from realist, to abstraction, to surrealist. David Mullen has practiced fine art photography for over 35 years. He views photography as a great printmaking art and has worked in black and white processes such as Van Dyke brown, platinum, silver gelatin and digital formats. For the last seventeen years, Mullen has dedicated his time to black and white and color photography as well as painting in water media such as watercolor, gouache, and acrylics.
Mullen has won numerous awards for his work.

Philosophical beliefs
Mullen thinks a person has the right to their spiritual beliefs; he respects this, and believes there is something to glean from all peaceful points of view. Reflection of diverse philosophical viewpoints is to keep an open perspective of the world we live. In his still life portfolio of orchids and other floras’, his goal is to use the intense beauty found in the natural world as an expression of the effulgence that is seen in all things.

David has deep feelings about what is going on in the world today and has a keen perspective on religious intolerance, racism, genocide, war and selfish excesses. His recent ArtPrize entry entitled, “Post Modern Dark Ages,” is a black and white triptych of images depicting war, ‘the haves and have-nots,’ and a host of environmental consequences. It is a dark and somewhat humorous commentary. These particular pieces depict controversial personages, both historical and contemporary and the artist's intent is to leave the viewer to contemplate the world we live in.

Jury Selections and Awards

2010

Digital Prints, “San Miguel Good Friday 1”, “San Miguel Good Friday 2”, “Loretto Good Friday” and “Untitled” piece jury-selected for 2010 Festival of the Arts, Grand Rapids, Michigan. “San Miguel Good Friday 2” received the J. Russell Award for Photographic Excellence and “Loretto Good Friday” received the Bill Pieri Photography Award.

2003-2005

Jury-selected for the Ann Arbor, Michigan Art Fair and Ludington, Michigan Art Fair. Best of Show, Ludington Art Fair 2003

2001

Chromogenic prints, “Vanda” and “Vanda Mirror Pool,” jury-selected for 2001 Festival of the Arts, Grand Rapids, Michigan. Both received Purchase Awards

1998

Paintings, “Canonization” and “Three Pears” jury-selected for 1998 Festival of the Arts, Grand Rapids, Michigan. “Three Pears” received a Purchase Award

1997

Chromogenic print, “Tulips,” jury-selected for 1997 Festival of the Arts, Grand Rapids, Michigan. Winner of City of Grand Rapids Purchase Award

1996

Chromogenic floral, “Sunflower,” jury-selected for 1996 Festival of the Arts, Grand Rapids, Michigan

1995

Chromogenic floral still life jury-selected for 1995 Festival of the Arts, Grand Rapids, Michigan

1994

Chromogenic print, “Joshua Tree,” winner of Best Color Photography, 1994 Festival of the Arts, Grand Rapids, Michigan.

1994

Hand-colored oil on silver print, “The Climb,” jury-selected for Battle Creek Fine Arts Center exhibit, Battle Creek, Michigan

1990-1993

Silver prints jury-selected for Festival of the Arts ’90, ’91, ’92 and ‘93

1992

“The Climb,” Best of Show in county/regional photography exhibit at Grand Rapids Community College, Grand Rapids, Michigan

1984

“Ally 2,” silver print, selected Best of Show at 1984 Festival of the Arts, Grand Rapids, Michigan

Exhibits

2010

September 22 – October 10 - ArtPrize - Juried triptych of digital photography entitled “Post Modern Dark Ages” displayed at Riverview Center Professional Building, Grand Rapids, Michigan

June – Four photography prints jury selected by Grand Rapids Festival of the Arts, Old Federal Building, Grand Rapids, Michigan

2007-2009
Studied digital photography and printmaking. Created portfolios of architectural, Oaxacan, landscapes, abstracts, surrealism and floral art

2003-2005

Exhibited at juried fine art fairs throughout Michigan

2001

July – Exhibit of chromogenic photography, “Orchid Portfolio,” Good Goods Gallery, Saugatuck, Michigan

June–July- Exhibit of chromogenic photography, Four Friends Coffeehouse, Grand Rapids, Michigan

1999

July- Exhibit of chromogenic photography in “Four Artists Celebrate the Fourth,” Good Goods Gallery, Saugatuck, Michigan

May–June – “A Dance of Color and Light,” solo show at Frederik Meijer Garden, exhibiting Chromogenic floral prints; Grand Rapids, Michigan

1998

June – Featured artist at Grand Rapids Art Museum Retail Gallery, Grand Rapids, Michigan

1997

October – Featured artist, Gallery Walk, Good Goods Gallery, Saugatuck, Michigan

October – November – Solo show at Frederick Meijer Garden, Grand Rapids, Michigan

1996

August – Three-person exhibit of fine art photography, Ten Weston Gallery, Grand Rapids, Michigan

April – May Chromogenic florals (the “blooms in Nudes, Blooms…and All That Jazz”), San Chez, Grand Rapids, Michigan

1995

October – November – Chromogenic florals and silver print still life studies in “Shooting from the Rapids” photography exhibit, LaClaire Fine Arts Gallery, Grand Rapids, Michigan

1983

Solo show of silver prints, “Not Exactly the Blues” Ryerson Gallery, Grand Rapids Public Library, Grand Rapids, Michigan

1982

Joint photography exhibit at Ryerson Gallery, Grand Rapids Public Library, Grand Rapids, Michigan

Collections

Warner, Norcross & Judd Corporate Collection, Grand Rapids, Michigan

Haworth, Inc. Corporate Collection, Holland, Michigan

Grand Rapids Community College Science and Technology Center

Loyola University of Chicago, Illinois, Stritch School of Medicine

Private collection of Dieter Noga, Hamburg, Germany

Numerous private collections throughout the United States

Publications

Article in Art Business News, “Trendsetters: Emerging Artists,” October 2001

Chromogenic floral, “Kind of Blue,” April 2001 cover of On The Town magazine, Grand Rapids, Michigan

Chromogenic floral, “Vulcan World,” August 1998 cover of On The Town magazine, Grand Rapids, Michigan

Chromogenic floral, “Gloxinia,” August 1996 cover of On The Town magazine, Grand Rapids, Michigan

Education

Grand Rapids Community College and Grand Valley State University

External links 
 http://www.festivalgr.org/rac-awards
 https://web.archive.org/web/20110725014846/http://www.artprize.org/Search-2.aspx?item=0&keys=David+Mullen
 https://web.archive.org/web/20100927045024/http://www.drlmullenphoto.com/
 https://web.archive.org/web/20110714131505/http://www.mullenfineart.com/

1952 births
Living people
American photographers
Grand Rapids Community College alumni